Flemma is a village in Gjemnes Municipality in Møre og Romsdal county, Norway. Across the fjord from Flemma is the village of Gyl in Tingvoll Municipality.

References

Gjemnes
Villages in Møre og Romsdal